Lepidosperma asperatum is a sedge (in the family Cyperaceae) that is endemic to Western Australia. It was first described in 1941 by Georg Kükenthal as Lepidosperma leptostachyum var. asperatum, but was elevated to species status in 2012 by Karen Wilson and Russell Barrett.

Distribution
It is found in the IBRA regions of the
Avon Wheatbelt, the Geraldton Sandplains, the Jarrah Forest, the Mallee biogeographic region, and the Swan Coastal Plain.

References

Flora of Western Australia
asperatum
Taxa named by Russell Lindsay Barrett
Plants described in 1941